Dorothea Foster Black (23 December 1891 – 13 September 1951) was an Australian painter and printmaker of the Modernist school, known for being a pioneer of Modernism in Australia. In 1951, at the age of sixty, Black was killed in a car crash.

Early life and training

Dorrit Black was born in the Adelaide suburb of Burnside, the daughter of engineer and architect Alfred Barham Black and Jessie Howard Clark, an amateur artist and daughter of John Howard Clark, editor of the South Australian Register. She attended the South Australian School of Arts and Crafts in about 1909, working in watercolours, and attended the Julian Ashton Art School in Sydney in 1915, concentrating on working in oils.

In 1927, Black went by herself to London and attended the Grosvenor School of Modern Art, where she experimented with colour linocut printing while studying under Claude Flight. Black was influenced by Flight to use bold geometrical patterns and harmonious colour schemes. In 1928, she studied at André Lhote's Academy in Paris. Black was influenced by Lhote's "compostional principles of geometric order". In 1929, she briefly worked with Albert Gleizes.

Black was strongly influenced by the Modernist and Cubist art movements she was exposed to in London and Paris. By the time she returned to her home country in late 1929, Black had become an active proponent of the Cubist style, and brought the styles back to Australia with her. Black then held an exhibition at Macquarie Galleries in Sydney in 1930. This was one of six one-woman shows which were to feature her work.

The Modern Art Centre, Margaret Street, Sydney 
Dorrit Black was interested in creating an environment that would enable others to work in the new style. She established the Modern Art Centre in Margaret Street, Sydney in 1931, the first gallery in Australia to devote itself to modernism. It was also one of the first galleries in Australia to be established by a woman. Over the next few years, the Modern Art Centre became a "source of inspiration and opening to a wider vision" to artists such as Nancy Hall. It hosted small but significant exhibitions by artists who became important proponents of Australian modernism, including Roland Wakelin, Grace Crowley, Grace Cossington Smith, Ralph Balson and Rah Fizelle.

Works 
Black created most of her linocuts in the 1930s. She worked mainly in water-colours in the late 1930s and then returned to working in oils. She settled in Adelaide, South Australia, in the late 1930s with her ageing mother, and painted many landscapes of the Adelaide hills and the south coast.

Black's lino-prints were integral to her arts practice. "She captured the energy of the modern age." As she grew older "the vitality of the natural world" became fundamental. "Air Travel 3: The pineapple plantation" is an example of Black's lino-prints. The making of linocuts allowed Black to abstract her subjects by eliminating detail and emphasising structure. Abstraction allowed her to communicate sensation.

She is noted for her painting of the Sydney Harbour Bridge as it was being constructed. Black was a finalist for the Archibald Prize for portraiture in 1931. The Art Gallery of South Australia purchased her work Mirmande (1928) in 1940.

Black painted the Sydney Harbour Bridge at various stages of construction. The Bridge has been painted in jewel-like colours such as, aquamarine and “shimmering peacock.” The Bridge, by Black, was Australia’s first Cubist landscape. It was painted in 1930, in Sydney.

On returning to Adelaide, Black taught part-time at the South Australian School of Art. She was a member of the South Australian Society of Arts and the Contemporary Art Society. Dorrit Black died in the Royal Adelaide Hospital on 13 September 1951, at the age of 59, after a car accident. Her body was cremated following a Unitarian service.

Professional activity and recognition 
Women were trailblazers of Modernism in Australia, and Black is recognised as "a prime force in educating Australians in the appreciation of modern art." Her work was described by critic Ivor Francis as:

deeply respected by the more informed section of Adelaide artists. She has so consistently been artistically cold-shouldered and ignored since her return here about 20 years ago that it is amazing how she maintained the courage to fight on against so much prejudice and misunderstanding. Regarded as not sufficiently "advanced" by one section, and too "modern" by the other, it will be many years before her exceptional talent can be properly appreciated in its right perspective, as it most certainly will be.

Her work is represented in the collections of the National Gallery of Australia as well as in many state and regional galleries, and in the Victoria and Albert Museum, London. A travelling retrospective of her work was organized by the Art Gallery of South Australia in 1975, who presented a major exhibition of her work from 14 June to 7 September 2014. She was represented in the National Gallery of Australia's Know My Name exhibition in 2020.

References

External links
Dorrit Black: Unseen Forces (2014 Exhibition in Adelaide)
Dorrit Black: Biography
Dorrit Black: A thoroughly Modern Master
Dorrit Black Building 
Dorrit Black: Unseen Forces Gallery 
List of all Dorrit Black Paintings

Further reading
 The art of Dorrit Black. Macmillan; [Adelaide]: Art Gallery of South Australia, South Melbourne, Vic, 1979.
 Gaze, Delia, Mihajlovic, Maja and Shrimpton, Leanda Dictionary of women artists. Fitzroy Dearborn, London; Chicago, 1997.
 Harding, Lesley, and Sue Cramer, eds. Cubism and Australian Art. No. 124. The Miegunyah Press, 2009.
 North, Ian, Black, Dorrit, 1891–1951 and Art Gallery of South Australia.
 Lock, Tracey, Dorrit Black: Unseen Forces, Art Gallery of South Australia, Adelaide, 2017

1891 births
1951 deaths
20th-century Australian women artists
20th-century Australian artists
Australian printmakers
Road incident deaths in South Australia
Artists from Adelaide
Accidental deaths in South Australia
Alumni of the Grosvenor School of Modern Art
Women printmakers
20th-century printmakers
Julian Ashton Art School alumni